Daniel Louis Aiello Jr. (June 20, 1933 – December 12, 2019) was an American actor. He appeared in numerous motion pictures, including The Godfather Part II (1974), The Front (1976), Once Upon a Time in America (1984), Hide in Plain Sight (1984), The Purple Rose of Cairo (1985), Moonstruck (1987), Harlem Nights (1989), Do the Right Thing (1989), Jacob's Ladder (1990), Hudson Hawk (1991), Ruby (1992), Léon: The Professional (1994), 2 Days in the Valley (1996), Dinner Rush (2000), and Lucky Number Slevin (2006). He played Don Domenico Clericuzio in the miniseries The Last Don (1997).

Aiello was nominated for an Academy Award for Best Supporting Actor for his role as Salvatore "Sal" Frangione in the Spike Lee film Do the Right Thing (1989).

Early life 
Aiello, the fifth of six children, was born on West 68th Street, Manhattan, the son of parents Frances Pietrocova, a seamstress from Naples, Italy, and Daniel Louis Aiello, a laborer who deserted the family after his wife lost her eyesight and became legally blind. For many years, Aiello publicly condemned his father, but the two reconciled in 1993, although Aiello harbored a resentment of his father's conduct. He was of Italian descent. He moved to the South Bronx when he was seven, and later attended James Monroe High School.

At the age of 16, Aiello lied about his age to enlist in the United States Army. After serving for three years, he returned to New York City and did various jobs in order to support himself and, later, his family.

In the 1960s, Aiello served as president of New York Local 1202 of the Amalgamated Transit Union, representing Greyhound Bus workers. In 1967, he presided over an unsanctioned wildcat strike when the company changed bus driver schedules. The strike was called without authorization by the parent union and he was suspended for that action. He called off the strike after one day.

He was also a bouncer at the legendary New York City comedy club, The Improv. In the mid-1980s, he was a nightly regular at Café Central, a bistro frequented by celebrities on 79th Street and Amsterdam Avenue, in Manhattan, and at an eatery named Columbus restaurant on 66th Street and Columbus Avenue.

Career

Film and television
Aiello broke into films in the early 1970s. One of his earliest roles came as a ballplayer in the baseball drama, Bang the Drum Slowly (1973), with Robert De Niro. Aiello had a walk-on role as small-time hood Tony Rosato in The Godfather Part II (1974), ad-libbing the line "Michael Corleone says hello!" during a hit on rival gangster Frank Pentangeli (Michael V. Gazzo).

Aiello had a co-lead role with Jan-Michael Vincent in Defiance (1980), about some Manhattan residents who fight back against the thugs terrorizing the neighborhood. He received considerable acclaim for playing a racist New York City cop in Fort Apache, The Bronx (1981) with Paul Newman. In 1981, Aiello won a Daytime Emmy Award for Outstanding Performer in Children's Programming for his appearance in an ABC Afterschool Special called A Family of Strangers.

He was paired with De Niro again for the Sergio Leone gangster epic, Once Upon a Time in America (1984), as a police chief whose name was also "Aiello." His many film appearances included two for director Woody Allen, who cast him in The Purple Rose of Cairo (1985), and Radio Days (1987). He played a main role in the 1985-86 television series Lady Blue.

Aiello played the pizzeria owner Sal in Spike Lee's Do the Right Thing (1989). At the time of the film's release, in an interview with the Chicago Tribune, he called the role his "first focal part". He further identified the film as a very collaborative effort, during which Spike Lee at one point told him, "Whatever you wanna do, you do." Aiello went on to write a crucial scene he shared with John Turturro ten minutes prior to its production. The role earned him nominations for a Golden Globe Award for Best Supporting Actor – Motion Picture and the Academy Award for Best Supporting Actor, while the film critics' associations of Boston, Chicago, and Los Angeles each named him best supporting actor.

Aiello also portrayed more sympathetic characters. He gained recognition as the befuddled fiancé of Cher opposite her Oscar-winning performance in the romantic comedy Moonstruck (1987), and made a comic appearance in drag for the Robert Altman fashion-industry film Prêt-à-Porter (1994). He also had sympathetic roles in the horror thriller Jacob's Ladder (1990) and the comedy-drama 29th Street (1991).

Aiello played nightclub owner and Lee Harvey Oswald assassin Jack Ruby in the biopic Ruby (1992), the lead role in Paul Mazursky's film business satire The Pickle (1993), the titular character in the Academy Award-winning short film Lieberman in Love (1995), and a political big shot with mob ties in City Hall (1996), starring Al Pacino. He later starred in the independent feature film Dolly Baby (2012), written and directed by Kevin Jordan; Aiello also starred in Jordan's Brooklyn Lobster, which premiered at the Toronto International Film Festival in 2005.

Music 
Aiello's singing was on display in films such as Hudson Hawk (1991), Once Around (1991), and Remedy (2005) that starred his son Ricky Aiello and Jonathan Doscher. He released several albums featuring a big-band including I Just Wanted to Hear The Words (2004), Live from Atlantic City (2008), and My Christmas Song for You (2010). Aiello and EMI songwriter Hasan Johnson released an album of standards fused with rap entitled Bridges in 2011.

He played the father for the video of Madonna's song, "Papa Don't Preach" (1986), and recorded his own answer song, "Papa Wants the Best for You", written by Artie Schroeck.

Theater 
Aiello appeared on the Broadway stage many times throughout the 1970s and 1980s. He appeared in three plays by Louis La Russo II: Lamppost Reunion (his Broadway debut - 1975), Wheelbarrow Closers (1976), and Knockout (1979). In 1977, he originated the role of Fran Geminiani in the long-running play Gemini.

In 1981, Aiello starred in Woody Allen's play The Floating Light Bulb alongside Beatrice Arthur. The play, set in 1945, is a semi-autobiographical tale of a lower middle class family living in Brooklyn, New York City. Frank Rich, critic from The New York Times gave the play a mild review, writing "there are a few laughs, a few well-wrought characters, and, in Act II, a beautifully written scene that leads to a moving final curtain". Rich also compared the play to the work of Tennessee Williams.

In the mid 1980s, Aiello starred in a replacement cast version of Hurlyburly (1984) alongside Christine Baranski, Frank Langella, Ron Silver, and Candice Bergen. He also starred in The House of Blue Leaves (1986) alongside John Mahoney (who earned a Tony Award for his performance), Ben Stiller, Stockard Channing, and Julie Hagerty

In 2002, Aiello starred in Elaine May's comedic play, Adult Entertainment alongside May's daughter, Jeannie Berlin. The play was directed by Stanley Donen and opened off-broadway at the Variety Arts Theatre. Critic Ben Brantley of The New York Times, described the play as an "often very funny, but overstretched comedy sketch".

In July 2011, Aiello appeared Off-Broadway in the two-act drama The Shoemaker, written by Susan Charlotte and directed by Antony Marsellis. The play is a stage version of his 2006 movie A Broken Sole, which began life in 2001 as a one-act play.

Personal life 
Aiello lived in Ramsey, New Jersey, for many years. He later moved to Saddle River, New Jersey.

In 2014, Aiello published his autobiography, I Only Know Who I Am When I Am Somebody Else: My Life on the Street, on the Stage, and in the Movies via Simon & Schuster. He was the father of stuntman and actor Danny Aiello III, who died in 2010 of pancreatic cancer. Another son Rick, who was also an actor, died in 2021 of the same disease. His surviving children are Jaime, and Stacey Aiello. His nephew is Michael Kay, broadcaster for the New York Yankees.

Death
Aiello died on December 12, 2019, at age 86, at a hospital in New Jersey, following a brief illness.

Many in the entertainment industry voiced their sadness either on Twitter or released statements, such as his Moonstruck co-star Cher, and Robert De Niro, who starred alongside Aiello in four films: Bang the Drum Slowly (1973), The Godfather Part II (1974), Once Upon a Time in America (1984), and Mistress (1992). De Niro wrote, "I am very saddened to hear of Danny's passing. I have known him for almost 50 years. See you in Heaven, Danny."

Aiello's funeral was held on December 19, 2019, at the Riverside Memorial Chapel on the Upper West Side. Director Spike Lee and actor John Turturro gave eulogies. Lee stated, "We recognized our differences, political or whatever else you want to talk about it, but we truly loved each other."

Filmography

Film

Television

Theatre

Awards

Publications

See also 
 List of crooners
Bronx Walk of Fame

References

External links 

1933 births
2019 deaths
20th-century American male actors
21st-century American male actors
Male actors from New Jersey
Male actors from New York City
American male film actors
American male stage actors
American male television actors
American male voice actors
American people of Italian descent
People from Manhattan
People from Ramsey, New Jersey
People from Saddle River, New Jersey
Entertainers from the Bronx
Military personnel from New York City
United States Army soldiers
James Monroe High School (New York City) alumni
Writers from the Bronx
New Jersey Republicans